Before the Athenian democracy, the tyrants, and the Archons, the city-state of Athens was ruled by kings. Most of these are probably mythical or only semi-historical. The following lists contain the chronological order of the title King of Athens (also prescribed earlier as kings of Attica), a semi-mythological title.

Earliest kings
These three kings were supposed to have ruled before the flood of Deucalion.

Erechtheid dynasty
The early Athenian tradition, followed by the 3rd century BC Parian Chronicle, made Cecrops, a mythical half-man half-serpent, the first king of Athens. The dates for the following kings were conjectured centuries later, by historians of the Hellenistic era who tried to backdate events by cross-referencing earlier sources such as the Parian Chronicle. Tradition says that King Menestheus took part in the Trojan War.

The following list follows that of 1st Century BC Castor of Rhodes (FGrHist 250), with Castor's dates given in modern terms.

Melanthid dynasty
Melanthus was the Neleides king of Pylos in Messenia. Being driven out by the Dorian and Heraclidae invasion, he came to Athens where Thymoestes resigned the crown to him. Codrus, the last king, repelled the Dorian invasion of Attica.

 
After Codrus's death, his sons Medon and Acastus either reigned as kings, or became hereditary archons.  In 753 BC the hereditary archonship was replaced by a non-hereditary system (see Archons of Athens).

Notes

References

 Gantz, Timothy, Early Greek Myth: A Guide to Literary and Artistic Sources, Johns Hopkins University Press, 1996, Two volumes:  (Vol. 1),  (Vol. 2).
 Harding, Phillip, The Story of Athens: The Fragments of the Local Chronicles of Attika, Routledge, 2007. .
 Jacoby, Felix, "Die Attische Königsliste", Klio 3 (1902), 406–439.

 
Kings in Greek mythology
Athens
Ancient Greek titles
Mycenaean Greece
Athens, Kings
Athens-related lists
16th-century BC establishments
Attican characters in Greek mythology